The mass media in Barbados have had a long history of being entitled to an open policy by the Government, and by the citizenry with respect to press Freedoms.  Barbados has a collection of local and foreign owned media entities providing the country with varying views via newspaper, magazine, television, or radio communications.

In terms of broadcast media, the Barbados Government largely has a hands off policy, as long as the content being aired by a media outlet is not profane, libelous, lewd, slanderous or vile.  Depending on the severity, situations like a swearing offense could treated by an initial warning, and might proceed to monetary fines only if further instances continue.

See also
Communications in Barbados
List of newspapers in Barbados
List of radio stations in Barbados
Multi-Choice TV (Barbados) – Cable channel provider

External links
 The Nation News (Largest Daily Newspaper)
 Barbados Advocate (Newspaper)
 Barbados Free Press (Political Commentary)
 Broad Street News (Financial Commentary)
 CBC Caribbean Broadcasting Corp – Barbados Radio AM900
 The HEAT – Weekly news tabloid with no internet site to date (12 November 2006)

 
Barbados
Barbados